Marcy-l'Étoile is a commune in the Metropolis of Lyon in Auvergne-Rhône-Alpes region in eastern France.

See also
Communes of the Metropolis of Lyon
Parc de Lacroix-Laval

References

 
Lyonnais